The Apple A6 is a 32-bit package on package (PoP) system on a chip (SoC) designed by Apple Inc. that was introduced on September 12, 2012 at the launch of the iPhone 5. Apple states that it is up to twice as fast and has up to twice the graphics power compared with its predecessor, the Apple A5. Software updates for devices using this chip ceased in 2019, with the release of iOS 10.3.4 on the iPhone 5 as it was discontinued with the release of iOS 11 in 2017.

Design 
The Apple A6 is said to use a 1.3 GHz custom Apple-designed ARMv7-A architecture based dual-core CPU, called Swift, rather than a licensed CPU from ARM like in previous designs, and an integrated 266 MHz triple-core PowerVR SGX543MP3 graphics processing unit (GPU). The Swift core in the A6 uses a new tweaked instruction set featuring some elements of the ARM Cortex-A15 such as support for the Advanced SIMD v2, and VFPv4. Analysis suggests that the Swift core has a triple-wide frontend and two FPUs, compared with a two-wide core with a single FPU in the Cortex-A9 based predecessor.

The A6 processor package also incorporates 1 GB of LPDDR2-1066 RAM compared with 512MB of LPDDR2-800 RAM in the Apple A5 providing double the memory capacity while increasing the theoretical memory bandwidth from 6.4 GB/s to 8.5 GB/s.  The A6 includes an upgraded image signal processor (ISP), that compared with the ISP in the A5, improves the speed of image capture, low-light performance, noise reduction, and video stabilization.

The A6 is manufactured by Samsung on a high-κ metal gate (HKMG) 32 nm process and the chip is 96.71 mm2 large, which is 22% smaller than the A5.  The A6 also consumes less energy than its predecessor.

A version of the A6 with higher frequency and four graphic cores is called Apple A6X and is found only in the fourth generation iPad.

Products that include the Apple A6 
The Apple A6 chip is only used in iPhones, and not in iPads nor any generation of iPod Touch, iPad minis, or Apple TVs.
 iPhone 5
 iPhone 5C

Gallery

See also 
 Apple silicon, the range of ARM-based processors designed by Apple.
 Apple A6X

References

Products introduced in 2012
Products and services discontinued in 2017
Computer-related introductions in 2012
Apple silicon